Paris by Night is a 2012 French crime film directed by Philippe Lefebvre.

Plot
Each night, vice police captain Simon Weiss checks a number of night clubs. As he tries to ensure they obey the law, he has to deal with gangsters, drug dealers and the suspicions of his own force.

Cast 
 Roschdy Zem as Simon Weiss
 Sara Forestier as Laurence Deray
 Samuel Le Bihan as Tony Garcia
 Grégory Fitoussi as Paul Gorsky
 Jean-Pierre Martins as Jo Linder
 Jean-Paul Muel as Solange
 Sophie Broustal as Josy, the boss at the "Magnifique"
 Gérald Laroche as Alex, the boss at the "No Comment"

References

External links 

2012 films
2012 crime films
French crime films
Films about police corruption
Films set in Paris
2010s French films
2010s French-language films